The Han River, also known by its Chinese names Hanshui and Han Jiang, is a major river in Central China.

The river gave its name to the Han dynasty and, through it, to the Han Chinese, the dominant ethnicity in China and the most populous ethnic group in the world.  It is also the namesake of the city of Hanzhong on its upper course.

Geography

The headwaters of the Han flow from Mount Bozhong in southwestern Shaanxi. The stream then travels east across the southern part of that province. Its highland valley—known as the Qinba Laolin—divides and is protected by the Qinling or Qin Mountains to its north and the Dabashan or Daba Mountains to its south. The main cities are Hanzhong in the west and Ankang in the east. It then enters Hubei. It crosses most of Hubei from the northwest to the southeast, flowing into the Yangtze at the provincial capital Wuhan, a city of several million inhabitants. The merging rivers divide the city of Wuhan into three sections: Wuchang in the south, Hankou to the northeast of the confluence, and Hanyang to its southwest. The area surrounding the confluence is known as the Jianghan Plain.

Apart from a few major basins, such as the area around Hanzhong, the highlands of the Han were covered in primeval forests as late as the 19th century. The Nanshan Forest covered the northern slopes; the Bashan Forest, the southern.

Hydroelectric Projects
Danjiangkou Dam was constructed on the Han River in northern Hubei in 1958. It has been heightened since. The Danjiangkou Reservoir created thereby is now used as part of the South–North Water Transfer Project.

Culture
The river was previously considered holy by the inhabitants on its banks. It is also considered part of the dividing line between northern and southern China.

See also
 Xihan River, the "Western Han"

Notes

References

Rivers of Shaanxi
Rivers of Hubei
Tributaries of the Yangtze River
Jianghan Plain